Sri Mariamman Temple is Medan's oldest Hindu Temple. This temple was built in 1884 for the worship of Goddess Mariamman. The temple is situated in the area known as Kampung Madras or Medan's Little India. This temple is also devoted to the Hindu Gods Ganesha, and Murugan, children of Mariamman. The Gate is decorated by gopuram, namely storey tower which can usually be found at the gate of the Hindus temples in South India. The temple is a meeting point for worshippers during Thaipusam and Deevapali festivals.

History 

This temple was built in 1884 and is the oldest Hindu temple in the city of Medan which serves as a place for the worship of Goddess Mariamman. This temple was built by co-operative efforts of all the early Tamil settlers in Medan, who then were workers at a plantation company located in North Sumatra. The temple was also headed by Sami Rangga Naiker and Somusundram Vaithiyar, Ramasamy Vaithiyar, who were also donors for the construction of this temple.

The Sri Mariamman temple is located on the street Teuku Umar 18, which is 500 meters from the Gunung Timur Temple. This temple is located in Kampung Madras which is an area in Medan populated predominantly by Tamil who are Hindus. This temple is adjacent to the Sun plaza. The temple shares the same architecture as other Hindu temples in South India and Sri Lanka, unlike several other Hindu temple in other part of Indonesia that conforms to the Javanese or Balinese-style. The Sri Mariamman temple was inaugurated its use for Hindu Dharma on October 23, 1991, by the ex-Governor of North Sumatra H. Raja Inal Siregar.

Deities 

Sri Mariamman temple was named after the goddess Mariamman. According to Hindu belief, Goddess Mariamman is the goddess who is believed to have the power to cure many diseases, relieve mild forms diseases, outbreaks of severe illnesses and can cause it to rain when experiencing drought. The goddess is worshiped in several regions of South India such as Andhra Pradesh, Tamil Nadu and Karnataka. Besides being used to worship the Goddess Mariamman, is also used to worship the Hindu gods such as Lord Vishnu, Lord Ganesha, Lord Shiva, Lord Durga, Lord Murugan and other gods.

Architecture 

The temple is surrounded by walls, with the height of 2.5 meters. In the front, there is the entrance to the Temple of Arca Tuwarasakti and reliefs and statue of Lord Shiva above the entrance. Tuwarasakti is described as a woman, because it is the guardian of goddess Mariamman as well. She has a beautiful face, with four arms that carry a trident, mace and pasa and hand attitude counts a warning.

On the front wall to the right there is a statue of Lakshmi. The statue in the middle, is the statue of the Hindu priest, depicted as wearing a turban, having a thick mustache, as a typology of the Tamil people. On the front wall, in the left, there is a statue of Parvathi. The Parvathi statue is two armed with one hand holding a water pot.

There are three chambers inside the temple where worship takes places. In the chambers, there are several statues, representing Lord Vishnu, Siva and Brahma. There are many unique ornaments in the temple, including statues that make the temple more beautiful.

In the inner sanctum:

 Murugan statue
 Vishnu statue
 Child Murugan statue
 Narayanan statue

Section to the left there are the sculptures consist of:
 Vinayagar statue
 Statue of Brahman, Sivan, Vishnu
 Agastya statue
 Statue of Sivan, Parvathi, Nandi

On the side of behind the temple there are also has statue of:
 Statue of Krishna
 Statues of Raja Rajeswari
 Statue of Thillai Natarajar

References

External links 
 http://indahnesia.com/indonesia.php?page=MEDCIT A Little Information about Medan's Sri Mariamman Temple
 http://www.pbase.com/boon3887/shri_mariamman_kuil Photos of the temple

Hindu temples in Indonesia
Buildings and structures in Medan
Dutch colonial architecture in Indonesia
Religious buildings and structures completed in 1884
Tourist attractions in North Sumatra
Mariamman temples
19th-century Hindu temples
Cultural Properties of Indonesia in North Sumatra